Sir Alexander Johnston, PC, FRS (died 6 March 1849), was a British colonial official who served as third Chief Justice of Ceylon and second Advocate Fiscal of Ceylon. He introduced a range of administrative reforms in Sri Lanka, introducing numerous liberal ideas and supporting the rights of natives. He was also an orientalist and along with Henry Thomas Colebrooke and others he was a founding member of the Royal Asiatic Society of Great Britain and Ireland.

Early life
Johnston was born in Carnsalloch, Dumfriesshire in Scotland to Samuel Johnston and Hester Napier, daughter of Francis Napier, 6th Lord Napier. Johnston moved with his family when his father obtained a posting in Madurai under Lord Macartney in the Madras Presidency in 1781. Alexander received his early education from Christian Friedrich Schwarz, the missionary as well as under Sir Thomas Munro. He could speak Tamil, Telugu, and Hindustani languages from an early age.

Colonial career

At the age of eleven, Alexander was offered a commission in the Dragoons but he chose instead to join the family to return to England in 1792. At the advice of Lord Macartney he studied law, initially at Göttingen and then at Lincoln's Inn. In 1799 he accepted a post as Advocate General in Ceylon in 1799 shortly after his marriage to Louisa Campbell (1766–1852), the daughter of Captain Lord William Campbell of the Royal Navy. He became a chief justice in 1805 and in 1809 he was asked to provide suggestions for the administration of Ceylon, many of which were included in the charter for the East India Company in 1813. He was knighted in 1811 and by 1817 he took up an honorary position as an admiralty judge.

Johnston was responsible for bringing the Mahavamsa, Sri Lanka's historical epic, to European attention when he sent manuscripts of it and other Sinhala chronicles to Europe for publication during his tenure as Chief Justice. Jonhston encouraged the translation of the Mahavamsa and other works in order to bring British colonial law into alignment with local traditions and values.

The reforms that Sir Alexander Johnston made included universal public education, freedom of religious practice, abolishment of slavery, employment of natives in government, and the codification of laws including the traditional views of Hindus, Muslims, and Buddhists.

Johnston returned to England in 1819.

Retirement
Johnston stood as a liberal representing the Dumfries burghs in 1840 but failed. After retirement Johnston founded the Royal Asiatic Society. He died on 6 March 1849 at London and was buried at Carnsalloch, Dumfriesshire.

Personal
His son Alexander Robert Johnston was a colonial official in Mauritius and Hong Kong before going to England (and died in the United States in 1888).

References

1849 deaths
19th-century British people
Attorneys General of British Ceylon
British Ceylon judges
Chief Justices of British Ceylon
Fellows of the Royal Society
Members of the Privy Council of the United Kingdom
Puisne Justices of the Supreme Court of Ceylon
Sri Lankan people of Scottish descent